Pixies are an American alternative rock band formed in 1986, in Boston, Massachusetts. Until 2013, the band consisted of Black Francis (vocals, rhythm guitar, songwriter), Joey Santiago (lead guitar), Kim Deal (bass, vocals) and David Lovering (drums). They disbanded acrimoniously in 1993 but reunited in 2004. After Deal left in 2013, Pixies hired Kim Shattuck as a touring bassist; she was replaced that year by Paz Lenchantin, who became a permanent member in 2016.

Pixies is associated with the 1990s alternative rock boom, and draws on elements including punk rock and surf rock. Their music is known for dynamic "loud-quiet-loud" shifts and song structures. Francis is Pixies' primary songwriter; his often surreal lyrics cover offbeat subjects such as extraterrestrials, incest, and biblical violence. The band achieved modest popularity in the US but was more successful in Europe. Their jarring pop sound influenced acts such as Nirvana, Radiohead, The Smashing Pumpkins and Weezer. Pixies' popularity grew in the years after their breakup, leading to a 2004 reunion, sold-out world tours and four further albums: Indie Cindy (2014), Head Carrier (2016), Beneath the Eyrie (2019) and Doggerel (2022).

History

Formation (1986) 
Guitarist Joey Santiago and songwriter Black Francis (born Charles Michael Kitteridge Thompson IV) met when they lived next to each other in a suite while attending the University of Massachusetts Amherst. Although Santiago was worried about distractions, he noticed Francis played music and the pair began to jam together. Francis embarked on a student exchange trip to Puerto Rico to study Spanish. After six months, he returned to Amherst and dropped out of the university. Francis and Santiago spent 1984 working in a Boston-area warehouse, with Francis composing songs on his acoustic guitar and writing lyrics on the subway train.

The pair formed a band in January 1986. Two weeks later, Francis placed an advertisement seeking a bass player who liked both the folk act Peter, Paul and Mary and the alternative rock band Hüsker Dü. Kim Deal was the only respondent, and arrived at the audition without a bass, as she had never played one before. She was invited to join as she liked the songs Francis showed her. She obtained a bass, and the trio started rehearsing in Deal's apartment.

After recruiting Deal, Kim paid for her sister, Kelley Deal, to fly to Boston and audition as drummer. Though Francis approved, Kelley was not confident in her drumming, and was more interested in playing songs written by Kim; she later joined Kim's band the Breeders. Kim's husband suggested they hire David Lovering, whom Kim had met at her wedding reception. The group arrived at a name after Santiago selected the word "pixies" randomly from a dictionary, liking how it looked and its definition as "mischievous little elves". Pixies moved rehearsals to Lovering's parents' garage in mid-1986 and began to play shows at bars in the Boston area.

Come on Pilgrim (1987) 
While Pixies were playing a concert with Throwing Muses, they were noticed by producer Gary Smith, manager of Fort Apache Studios. He told the band he "could not sleep until you guys are world famous". The band produced a 17-track demo at Fort Apache soon afterwards, known to fans as the Purple Tape because of the tape cover's purple background. Funded by Francis' father at the cost of $1000, the recording session was completed in three days. Local promoter Ken Goes became the band's manager, and he passed the demo to Ivo Watts-Russell of the independent record label 4AD. Watts-Russell nearly passed on the band, finding them too normal, "too rock 'n' roll", but signed them at the persuasion of his girlfriend.

Upon signing with 4AD, eight tracks from the Purple Tape were selected for the Come on Pilgrim mini-LP, Pixies' first release. Francis drew upon his experiences in Puerto Rico, mostly in the songs "Vamos" and "Isla de Encanta", describing the poverty in Puerto Rico and singing in loose Spanish. The religious lyrics in Come on Pilgrim and later albums came from his parents' born-again Christian days in the Pentecostal Church. Critic Heather Phares sees themes such as sexual frustration ("I've Been Tired") and incest ("Nimrod's Son" and "The Holiday Song") on the record.

Surfer Rosa and Doolittle (1988–1989) 
Come on Pilgrim was followed by Pixies' first full-length album, Surfer Rosa. The album was recorded by Steve Albini (who was hired by Watts-Russell on the advice of a 4AD colleague), completed in two weeks, and released in early 1988. Surfer Rosa gained Pixies acclaim in Europe; both Melody Maker and Sounds gave Surfer Rosa their "Album of the Year" award. American critical response was also positive yet more muted, a reaction that persisted for much of the band's career. The album was eventually certified Gold in the U.S. in 2005. After the album was released, the band arrived in England to support Throwing Muses on the European "Sex and Death" tour—beginning at the Mean Fiddler in London. The tour also took them to the Netherlands, where Pixies had already received enough media attention to be headlining the tour. The tour became notable for the band's in-jokes, such as playing their entire set list in alphabetical order.

Meanwhile, Pixies signed an American distribution deal with major record label Elektra. Around this time, Pixies struck up a relationship with the British producer Gil Norton. Norton produced their second full album, Doolittle, which was recorded in the last six weeks of 1988 and seen as a departure from the raw sound of Come on Pilgrim and Surfer Rosa. Doolittle had a much cleaner sound, largely due to Norton and the production budget of US$40,000, which was quadruple that of Surfer Rosa. Doolittle featured the single "Here Comes Your Man", which biographers Josh Frank and Caryn Ganz describe as an unusually jaunty and pop-like song for the band. "Monkey Gone to Heaven" was popular on alternative radio in the US, reaching the top 10 on the Billboard Modern Rock Tracks, and the single entered the Top 100 in the U.K. Like Surfer Rosa, Doolittle was acclaimed by fans and music critics alike. Doolittle was their first album to enter into the Billboard 200, peaking at 98. In the UK, the album was a commercial success, reaching number 8 in the Albums Chart.

Hiatus (1989–1990) 
After Doolittle, tensions between Deal and Francis came to a head (for example, Francis threw a guitar at Deal during a concert in Stuttgart), and Deal was almost fired from the band when she refused to play at a concert in Frankfurt. Santiago, in an interview with Mojo, described Deal as being "headstrong and want[ing] to include her own songs, to explore her own world" on the band's albums; eventually she accepted that Francis was the singer and had musical control of the band, but after the Frankfurt incident, "they kinda stopped talking". The band became increasingly tired during the post-Doolittle "Fuck or Fight" tour of the United States and fighting among members continued. After the tour's final date in New York City, the band was too exhausted to attend the end-of-tour party the following night and soon announced a hiatus.

During this time, Santiago and Lovering went on vacation while Francis performed a short solo tour, made up of a number of concerts to generate gas money as he traveled across the country. Deal formed a new band, the Breeders, with Tanya Donelly of Throwing Muses and bass player Josephine Wiggs of Perfect Disaster. Their debut album, Pod, was released in 1990.

Bossanova and Trompe le Monde (1990–1992) 
In 1990, all members of the group except for Deal moved to Los Angeles. Lovering stated that he, Santiago, and Francis moved there "because the recording studio was there". Unlike previous recordings, the band had little time to practice beforehand, and Black Francis wrote much of the album in the studio. Featuring the singles "Velouria" and "Dig for Fire", Bossanova reached number 70 in the United States. In contrast, the album peaked at number three in the United Kingdom. Also in 1990, Pixies released a cover of the Paul Butterfield Blues Band's "Born in Chicago" on the compilation album Rubáiyát: Elektra's 40th Anniversary.

The band continued to tour and released Trompe le Monde in 1991, their final album before their break-up. The album included "U-Mass", which has been described as being about college apathy, and whose guitar riff was written years before at the University of Massachusetts before Francis and Santiago dropped out. The album also featured a cover of "Head On" by the Jesus and Mary Chain. Also that year, the band contributed a cover of "I Can't Forget" to the Leonard Cohen tribute album I'm Your Fan, and began an international tour on which they played stadiums in Europe and smaller venues in the United States. They then signed to be the support act of U2 on the lucrative US leg of the Zoo TV Tour in 1992. Tensions rose among band members, and at the end of the year, Pixies went on sabbatical and focused on separate projects.

Breakup and solo projects (1993–2003) 
In early 1993, Francis announced in an interview to BBC Radio 5 that Pixies were finished, without however telling the other members of the band. He offered no explanation at the time. He later called Santiago and notified Deal and Lovering via fax.

After the breakup, the members embarked on separate projects. Black Francis renamed himself Frank Black, and released several solo albums, including a string of releases with Frank Black and the Catholics. Deal returned to the Breeders, who scored a hit with "Cannonball" from their platinum-selling Last Splash in 1993, and released more albums several years later. She also formed the Amps, who released one album.

Santiago played lead guitar on a number of Frank Black albums, as well as on other artists' albums. He wrote music for the television show Undeclared and theme music for the film Crime and Punishment in Suburbia. He formed the Martinis with his wife Linda Mallari, and released the album Smitten in 2004. In 2004, he also played lead guitar on the album Statecraft by the novelist and musician Charles Douglas. Lovering became a magician and performed a style of magic he called "scientific phenomenalism". He was temporarily a member of the Martinis, and later drummed with the band Cracker.

4AD and Elektra Records continued to release Pixies material: the best-of album Death to the Pixies (1997), the Peel-session compilation Pixies at the BBC (1998), and the Complete 'B' Sides compilation (2001). In 2002, material from Pixies' original 17-track demo tape was released as an EP, Pixies, on Cooking Vinyl in the U.K. and SpinART Records in the U.S.; Black has also used these labels to release solo work and albums with the Catholics.

Reunion (2003–2012) 

In the years following Pixies' breakup, Black dismissed rumors of a reunion, but incorporated an increasing number of Pixies songs in his sets with the Catholics, and occasionally included Santiago in his solo work and Lovering's magic show as an opening act to concerts. In 2003, a series of phone calls among band members resulted in some low-key rehearsals, and soon the decision to reunite. By February 2004, a full tour was announced, and tickets for nearly all the initial tour dates sold out within minutes.

Pixies played their first reunion concert on April 13, 2004, at the Fine Line Music Cafe in Minneapolis, Minnesota. A warm-up tour through the U.S. and Canada (in which all dates were recorded and released as individual limited-edition CDs, with some of the performances being released to streaming services in 2021) was followed by an appearance at the Coachella Valley Music and Arts Festival. The band then spent much of 2004 touring throughout Brazil, Europe, Japan, and the U.S. The group won the Act-of-the-Year award in the 2004 Boston Music Awards. The 2004 reunion tour grossed over $14 million in ticket sales.

In June 2004, the band released a new song, "Bam Thwok" exclusively on the iTunes Music Store; it reached number one in the UK Official Download Chart. 4AD released Wave of Mutilation: The Best of Pixies, along with a companion DVD, Pixies. The band also contributed a rendition of "Ain't That Pretty at All" to the Warren Zevon tribute album Enjoy Every Sandwich.

In 2005, Pixies made appearances at festivals including Lollapalooza, "T on the Fringe", and the Newport Folk Festival. They continued to make appearances through 2006 and 2007, culminating in their first shows in Australia. Francis suggested that a new Pixies studio album was possible, or unlikely, the main obstacle being Deal's reluctance.

To celebrate the 20th anniversary of the release of Doolittle, Pixies launched a tour in October 2009 where they performed the album track-for-track, including the associated B-sides. The tour began in Europe, continued in the United States in November, with the South American and Australian tour following in March 2010, then New Zealand, and more European dates in spring 2010, and back to North America in 2010.

Deal's departure and Indie Cindy (2013–2015)
On June 14, 2013, Pixies announced that Deal had left the band. Two weeks later, the band released a new song, "Bagboy", as a free download via Pixies' website. The song features Jeremy Dubs of Bunnies and formerly of the Bennies on vocals in place of Deal. , Deal and her former bandmates have no relationship.

On July 1, 2013, Pixies announced the addition of Muffs and Pandoras guitarist and vocalist Kim Shattuck to replace Deal for their 2013 European tour. On September 3, 2013, Pixies released an EP of new songs, EP1. On November 29, 2013, Shattuck announced that she had been dismissed from the band. In December 2013, it was announced that Entrance Band and A Perfect Circle bassist Paz Lenchantin was joining Pixies for the 2014 tour. More new material surfaced when Pixies released their second EP, EP2, on January 3, 2014. The single released to radio was "Blue Eyed Hexe". Another new EP, EP3, was released on March 24, 2014. All the EPs were only available as downloads and limited edition vinyl.

The three EPs were collected in LP format and released as the album, Indie Cindy, in April 2014. It was the first Pixies album in over two decades. In 2015, Pixies toured in support of Robert Plant for a series of dates across North America.

Head Carrier, Beneath the Eyrie, and Doggerel (2016–present)
In July 2016, Pixies announced that Lenchantin had become a permanent member of the band, and that their sixth album, Head Carrier, would be released on September 30, 2016. Their seventh album, Beneath the Eyrie, was released on September 13, 2019, backed by lead single "On Graveyard Hill". The Pixies released a podcast, It's a Pixies Podcast, documenting the recording of the album. In February 2022, Black Francis revealed that he had written up to forty songs for the band's next studio album. The band released a single, "Human Crime", in March 2022. They released their eighth studio album, Doggerel, with the single "There's a Moon On" on September 30, 2022, via BMG.

Style 
Pixies incorporates elements of surf rock and punk rock, with an emphasis on contrasting volume dynamics. Spin described them as "surf music-meets-Stooges spikiness and oft-imitated stop/start and quiet/loud dynamics". Its music has also been pictured as "an unorthodox marriage of surf music and punk rock, ... characterized by Black's bristling lyrics and hackle-raising caterwaul, Kim Deal's whispered harmonies and waspy basslines, Joey Santiago's fragile guitar, and the persistent flush of David Lovering's drums." The band's music incorporates extreme dynamic shifts; Francis explained in 1991, "Those are the two basic components of rock music ... the dreamy side and the rockin' side. It's always been either sweaty or laid back and cool. We do try to be dynamic, but it's dumbo dynamics, because we don't know how to do anything else. We can play loud or quiet—that's it."

Influences 
Pixies is influenced by a range of artists and genres; each member came from a different musical background. When he first started writing songs for Pixies, Francis says he was listening to nothing but Hüsker Dü, Captain Beefheart, and Iggy Pop; whilst in the run up to recording Come on Pilgrim he listened to R.E.M.'s Murmur a lot, which he described as "hugely influential" on his songwriting. During the making of Doolittle he listened heavily to the Beatles' White Album. He has cited Buddy Holly as a model for his compressed songwriting. Francis did not discover punk rock until he was 16, saying "it was good I didn't listen to these hip records". As a child, he listened mainly to 1960s songs, religious music and Emerson Lake and Palmer, [...] and Talking Heads, who he says "weren't punk either".

Santiago listened to 1970s and 1980s punk including Black Flag, as well as David Bowie and T. Rex. Guitarists who influenced him include Jimi Hendrix, Les Paul, Wes Montgomery, Lou Reed and George Harrison. Deal's musical background was folk music and country; she had formed a country-folk band with her sister in her teenage years, and played covers of artists such as the Everly Brothers and Hank Williams. Other artists Deal listened to included XTC, Gang of Four and Elvis Costello. Lovering is a fan of the band Rush.

Other media such as film has influenced Pixies; Francis cites surrealist films Eraserhead and Un chien andalou (as mentioned in "Debaser") as influences. He has commented on these influences, saying he "didn't have the patience to sit around reading Surrealist novels", but found it easier to watch twenty-minute films.

Songwriting and vocals 
Most of Pixies' songs are composed and sung by Francis. Critic Stephen Thomas Erlewine has described Francis's writing as containing "bizarre, fragmented lyrics about space, religion, sex, mutilation, and pop culture". Biblical violence is a theme of Doolittles "Dead" and "Gouge Away"; Francis told a Melody Maker interviewer, "It's all those characters in the Old Testament. I'm obsessed with them. Why it comes out so much I don't know." He has described Come on Pilgrims "Caribou" as being about reincarnation, and extraterrestrial themes appear in a number of songs on Bossanova.

Deal co-wrote Doolittles "Silver" with Francis, and they share lead harmony vocals on the track. She also co-wrote and sang lead vocals on Surfer Rosas "Gigantic", and is the sole songwriter of the 2004 digital single "Bam Thwok". She was credited as Mrs. John Murphy on "Gigantic"—at the time she was married, and she used this name as an ironic feminist joke. She also sang lead vocals on the song "Into the White" and the Neil Young cover "Winterlong", which were both B-sides. Lovering sang lead vocals on Doolittles "La La Love You" and the B-side "Make Believe". Most recently, Lenchantin made her lead vocal debut on Head Carriers "All I Think About Now". She also provided lead vocals on "Los Surfers Muertos", from 2019's Beneath The Eyrie and the 2020 September single "Hear Me Out".

Legacy 
Pixies' first album Surfer Rosa is certified gold, while Doolittle hit platinum status, selling over 1 million copies. The band influenced a number of musicians associated with the alternative rock boom of the 1990s. Gary Smith, who produced Come on Pilgrim, said in 1997:

I've heard it said about the Velvet Underground that while not a lot of people bought their albums, everyone who did started a band. I think this is largely true about Pixies as well. Charles' secret weapon turned out to be not so secret and, sooner or later, all sorts of bands were exploiting the same strategy of wide dynamics. It became a kind of new pop formula and, within a short while, "Smells Like Teen Spirit" was charging up the charts and even the members of Nirvana said later that it sounded for all the world like a Pixies song.

Sonically, Pixies are credited with popularizing the extreme dynamics and stop-start timing that would become widespread in alternative rock; Pixies' songs typically feature hushed, restrained verses, and explosive, wailing choruses. Artists including David Bowie, Matt Noveskey, Radiohead, PJ Harvey, U2, Nirvana, The Strokes, Alice in Chains, Weezer, Bush, Arcade Fire, Pavement, Everclear, Kings of Leon and Matthew Good have cited admiration of or influence by Pixies. Bono of U2 has called Pixies "one of America's greatest bands ever", and Radiohead's Thom Yorke said that Pixies "changed my life". Bowie, whose own music had inspired Francis and Santiago while they were at university, has said that the Pixies made "just about the most compelling music of the entire 80s."

One notable citation as an influence was by Kurt Cobain, on influencing Nirvana's "Smells Like Teen Spirit", which he admitted was a conscious attempt to co-opt Pixies' style. In a January 1994 interview with Rolling Stone, he said, "I was trying to write the ultimate pop song. I was basically trying to rip off Pixies. I have to admit it [smiles]. When I heard Pixies for the first time, I connected with that band so heavily I should have been in that band—or at least in a Pixies cover band. We used their sense of dynamics, being soft and quiet and then loud and hard." Cobain cited Surfer Rosa as one of his main musical influences, and particularly admired the album's natural and powerful drum sounds—a result of Steve Albini's influence on the record. Albini later produced Nirvana's 1993 In Utero at the request of Cobain.

Music videos and DVDs 
No music videos were released from Come on Pilgrim or Surfer Rosa, but from Doolittle onwards, the following videos were made: "Monkey Gone To Heaven", "Here Comes Your Man", "Velouria", "Dig For Fire", "Allison", "Alec Eiffel", "Head On", and "Debaser"; these were later released on the 2004 DVD Pixies. Furthermore, a music video accompanied the release of their 2013 song, "Bagboy", as well an alternate video released on a later date. Videos have been made for all the songs in EP1. The videos for "Here Comes Your Man" and "Allison" were also released on The Complete 'B' Sides.

By Bossanova, the band had developed a severe aversion to recording music videos, and Francis refused to lip-sync to them. For example, in the "Here Comes Your Man" video, both Black and Deal open their mouths wide instead of mouthing their lyrics. According to the record label, this became one of the reasons that Pixies never achieved major coverage on MTV. With Bossanovas release, 4AD hoped to get the Pixies chosen to perform their single "Velouria" on the BBC's Top of the Pops. To this end, the band was pressured into producing a video for the song, and made one cheaply with the band members filmed running down a quarry, shown in slow motion. The group was ultimately not given a spot on the show.

The 90-minute documentary loudQUIETloud: a film about the Pixies was directed by Steven Cantor and Matthew Galkin and released in 2006. The film documents their 2004 reunion and tour, and covers the years after the break-up. In addition to Pixies and LoudQUIETloud, four other Pixies' DVDs were released between 2004 and 2006, all featuring concert performances: Live at the Town and Country Club 1988, The Pixies—Sell Out, The Pixies Acoustic: Live in Newport, and The Pixies Club Date: Live at the Paradise in Boston.

Band members 

Current members
 Black Francis – lead and backing vocals, rhythm guitar, acoustic guitar (1986–1993, 2004–present)
 David Lovering – drums, percussion, backing vocals (1986–1993, 2004–present)
 Joey Santiago – lead guitar, backing vocals (1986–1993, 2004–present)
 Paz Lenchantin – bass, violin, backing and lead vocals (2014–present)

Former members
 Kim Deal – bass, backing and lead vocals (1986–1993, 2004–2013)
 Kim Shattuck – bass, backing vocals (2013; died 2019)

Timeline

Discography

Studio albums
 Surfer Rosa (1988)
 Doolittle (1989)
 Bossanova (1990)
 Trompe le Monde (1991)
 Indie Cindy (2014)
 Head Carrier (2016)
 Beneath the Eyrie (2019)
 Doggerel (2022)

See also 

 List of alternative rock artists
 List of songs recorded by Pixies
 Music of Massachusetts
 Music history of the United States in the 1980s

Citations

General and cited references

External links 

 
 

 
4AD artists
Alternative rock groups from Massachusetts
American indie rock groups
American punk rock groups
Musical groups established in 1986
Musical groups disestablished in 1993
Musical groups reestablished in 2004
Musical groups from Boston
Musical groups from Massachusetts
1986 establishments in Massachusetts
PIAS Recordings artists
Sonic Unyon artists
Elektra Records artists
Cooking Vinyl artists
SpinART Records artists